The Aeros Target is a family of Ukrainian high-wing, single and two-place hang gliders, designed and produced by Aeros of Kyiv and introduced in 1995. The two-place Target 21 Tandem remains in production in 2012.

Design and development
The Target series was conceived as a single-place beginner's hang glider for flight training and recreational flying and as such it has gentle flying characteristics. The design received British Hang Gliding and Paragliding Association (BHPA) certification in 1995. Over time the line has been refined and in 2012 the Target 21 Tandem was the last of the line still in production.

The 2003 model Target 162 was typical of the line. It is constructed from bolted together aluminum tubing with its single-surface wing covered in Dacron sailcloth. The wing is supported by cables suspended from a kingpost. The aircraft has weight-shift controls, actuated though an "A" frame control bar. The Target 162 sold for £1790 in 2003.

The single-place versions of the Target were replaced in the company's line by the Aeros Fox.

Variants
Target 13
Initial small-wing area version, introduced in 1995, certified by BHPA.
Target 16
Initial large-wing area version, introduced in 1995, certified by BHPA.
Target 132
BHPA certified.
Target 162
BHPA certified.
Target 192 Bi
Target 21 Tandem
Two-place model introduced in 2006, BHPA certified in 2007 and still in production in 2012, made from 7075-T6 aluminum tubing. Has optional fixed wheeled landing gear with bungee suspension.

Specifications (2003 model Target 132)

References

External links

Hang gliders
Target